(+)-Sativene synthase (EC 4.2.3.129, cop4) is an enzyme with systematic name (2E,6E)-farnesyl-diphosphate diphosphate-lyase (cyclizing, (+)-sativene-forming). This enzyme catalyses the following chemical reaction

 (2E,6E)-farnesyl diphosphate  (+)-sativene + diphosphate

This enzyme is isolated from the fungus Coprinus cinereus.

References

External links 
 

EC 4.2.3